The 2008 season of the FFAS Senior League was the twenty eighth season of association football competition in American Samoa. Pago Youth won the championship, their first recorded title, with the winners of the 1998 league competition and a number of previous seasons unknown.

League table

Results
The matrix below contains a record of all the known results for the season.

 Note 1: Pool was played on a round robin basis, results are reported as per RSSSF, hence why some teams appear to have played more "home" games than others.
 Note 2: A significant number of games, beyond those awarded as a result of the disqualification of Utuliei Youth, were awarded 3–0. All matches in the above matrix that finished either 3–0 or 0–3 were awarded with the exception of the match between Fagasa Youth and Tafuna Jets.
 Note 3: The match between FC SKBC and Peace Brothers was awarded 3–0 to FC SKBC after the game was abandoned in the 85th minute with the score 3–2 to Peace Brothers when Peace Brothers were left with only six players on the field.
The following results, but not scores are also known:
 Round 4: Fagatogo, Tafuna Jets and Renegades won away at Utulei Youth, FC SKBC and Lion Heart respectively, whilst Fagasa Youth and Green Bay lost away at Black Roses and PanSa Men's respectively.
 Round 5: Fagasa Youth drew with Lion Heart, Black Roses and Renegades won away at Peace Brothers and Green Bay respectively, whilst PanSa Men's and FC SKBC lost away at Tafuna Jets and Fagatogo respectively.
 Round 9: Fagatogo and Pago Youth won away at Peace Brothers and Green Bay respectively, whilst Ilaoa and Toomata, FC SKBC and Black Roses lost away at Tafuna Jets, Renegades and Lion Heart respectively.
 Round 10: Fagatogo, Fagasa Youth and Renegades won away at Ilaoa and Toomata, FC SKBC and PanSa Men's respectively, whilst Tafuna Jets and Green Bay lost away at Pago Youth and Black Roses respectively.

References

FFAS Senior League seasons
Amer
football